Viktor de Kowa (also spelled Victor de Kowa, born Victor Paul Karl Kowalczyk; 8 March 1904 – 8 April 1973) was a German stage and film actor, chanson singer, director, narrator, and comic poet.

Life
He was born the son of a farmer and engineer in Hohkirch near Görlitz (present-day Przesieczany in Poland), from where his family moved to Seifersdorf near Dippoldiswalde in Saxony in 1908 and to Chemnitz in 1913. De Kowa joined a cadet corps before he began occupational training as a graphic designer. Having attended drama classes with Erich Ponto, he gave his acting debut at the Staatstheater Dresden in 1922. After appearances in Lübeck, Frankfurt and Hamburg, de Kowa entered the stages of the Volksbühne and the Deutsches Theater in Berlin, as well as of the Prussian State Theatre under Gustaf Gründgens.

He had a first small film appearance in Nils Olaf Chrisander's The Heart Thief in 1927 and subsequently became one of the leading comic actors of the UFA film industry. During the Third Reich he joined the Nazi Party, directing the propaganda movie Kopf hoch, Johannes! in 1941. The film idealized the education of the German youth in National Political Institutes of Education, which earned de Kowa an entry on the Gottbegnadeten list to evade his Wehrmacht conscription, though Minister Goebbels was disillusioned with his directing.

Despite his involvement in Nazi cinema, de Kowa's film and theatre career quickly proceeded after the war. In 1945 he became director of the Berlin Tribüne theatre and an  ensemble member of the Vienna Burgtheater from 1956 to 1962. As chairman of the Arts Union, he was also a board director of the Confederation of German Trade Unions (DGB).

In 1964 he starred in the TV series Slim Callaghan Intervenes as Peter Cheyney's private detective Slim Callaghan.

Personal life
First married to actress Ursula Grabley (1908–1977) in 1926, de Kowa was remarried in 1941 to Japanese singer and actress Michiko Tanaka (1909–1988). Both are buried in Friedhof Heerstraße, in an Ehrengrab donated by the City of Berlin.

Selected filmography 

 Katharina Knie (1929) - Lorenz Knie
 Pension Schöller (1930) - Bernhardy
 1914 (1931) - Großfürst Michael
  (1931) - Victor Ronai
 The True Jacob (1931) - James
 The Other Side (1931) - Leutnant Hibbert
 The Pride of Company Three (1932) - Leutnant Fritz Gernsbach
 The Invisible Front (1932) - Junger Mann im Selbstmörderklub
 Tannenberg (1932) - Rittmeister Fürst Wolgoff
 Der Diamant des Zaren (1932) - Direktor Roller
 The Invisible Front (1933)
 The Marathon Runner (1933) - Georg Cornelius
 Typhoon (1933) - Charles Renard-Brinski
 Es war einmal ein Musikus (1933) - Heinz
 A Song Goes Round the World (1933) - Rigo
 Tell Me Who You Are (1933) - Frank Hesse
 Little Man, What Now? (1933) - Heilbutt
 Zwei im Sonnenschein (1933) - Paul
 The Castle in the South (1933) - Mirano
 Girls of Today (1933) - Peter Udde
 What Am I Without You (1934) - Heinrich Berger
 The Grand Duke's Finances (1934) - Grossherzog
 Pappi (1934) - Hans Werner
 Da stimmt was nicht (1934) - Baron Albrecht von Weiningen
 The Young Baron Neuhaus (1934) - Baron Neuhaus
 Decoy (1934) - Schott junior
 Ein Kind, ein Hund, ein Vagabund (1934) - Florian - ein Vagabund
 My Life for Maria Isabella (1935) - Fähnrich Menis
 Lärm um Weidemann (1935) - Dr. Hans Weidemann
 Die große und die kleine Welt (1936) - Franz Schuster - Taxichauffeur
 Scandal at the Fledermaus (1936) - Viktor Kendal
 Game on Board (1936) - Viktor Müller
 The Divine Jetta (1937) - Fritz Barsch
 Don't Promise Me Anything (1937) - Maler Martin Pratt
 Mit versiegelter Order (1938) - Willi Reinhardt
 Kleiner Mann - ganz groß! (1938) - Peter Kolle
 I Love You (1938) - Amerikaner Percy
 Der Optimist (1938) - Gustl
 Scheidungsreise (1938) - Dr. Delius
 Wibbel the Tailor (1939, director)
 The Thing About Styx (1942) - Rittmeister Styx
 We Make Music (1942) - Paul Zimmermann
 Altes Herz wird wieder jung (1943) - Neffe Dr. Paul Dehnhardt
 Ein glücklicher Mensch (1943) - Philipp, sein Sohn
 Das Leben geht weiter (1945) - Hauptmann Hoeßlin
 Peter Voss, Thief of Millions (1946) - Peter Voss
 Between Yesterday and Tomorrow (1947) - Michael Rott
 Intimitäten (1948) - Peter Korff
 Anonyme Briefe (1949)
 The Beautiful Galatea (1950) - Viktor Kolin
 Melody of Fate (1950)
 Scandal at the Embassy (1950) - Fred Corvin & Dr. Tamanyo
 The Blue Star of the South (1951) - Ivo
 The Prince of Pappenheim (1952) - Egon Fürst
 A Love Story (1954) - Manfred v. Prittwitz, Major
 Hochstaplerin der Liebe (1954) - Professor Angelot
 Des Teufels General (1955) - SS-Gruppenführer Schmidt-Lausitz
 Heaven Is Never Booked Up (1955) - Professor Behrens
 Before God and Man (1955) - Martin
 Music in the Blood (1955) - Kurt Widmann
 The Girl from Flanders (1956) - Monsieur le Curé Simon / Dr.Simon
  (1956)
 Scampolo (1958) - Minister
  (1958) - Theo
 Bombs on Monte Carlo (1960) - Minister
 Final Accord (1960) - Alexander von Berkin
 The Forger of London (1961) - Dr. Donald Wells
  (1961) - Loos
 Diesmal muss es Kaviar sein (1961) - Loos
 The House in Montevideo (1963) - Anwalt
 Encounter in Salzburg (1964) - Bernhard von Wangen
 Winnetou and Old Firehand'' (1966) - Robert Ravenhurst

References

External links
 
 Viktor de Kowa at Virtual History

1904 births
1973 deaths
People from the Province of Silesia
German male film actors
German male stage actors
German film directors
People from Zgorzelec County
20th-century German male singers
German theatre directors
Commanders Crosses of the Order of Merit of the Federal Republic of Germany
20th-century German male actors
20th-century German poets
German male poets
20th-century German male writers